Aars Municipality was formed by Kommunalreformen in 1970, which made the parishes into municipalities. Before the Kommunalreformen ("The Municipality Reform") of 2007, it was a municipality (Danish, kommune) in northern Denmark, in the county of North Jutland on the peninsula of Jutland. The municipality covers an area of 223 km2, and had a total population of 13,284 (2005).  Its latest mayor was Knud V. Christensen, a member of the Conservative People's Party (Det Konservative Folkeparti) political party. On January 1, 2007 Aars municipality ceased to exist and was merged with the former Farsø, Løgstør, and Aalestrup municipalities to form the new Vesthimmerland Municipality, with an area of 815 km2 and a total population of 39,176 (2005).

Mayors

The parishes
Aars municipality was made up of the following parishes:
Blære parish
Gislum parish
Giver parish
Gundersted parish 
Havbro parish
Skivum parish
Ulstrup parish
Vognsild parish
Aars parish
Many of them came from the Aars district in the Aalborg Amt.

Twin cities
 Kopparberg

References

 Municipal mergers and neighbors: Eniro new municipalities map

Former municipalities of Denmark